Itamar Medical is a multinational company focused on the development, manufacturing and sales of medical devices related to respiratory sleep disorders. The company is headquartered in Caesarea, Israel and is owned by ZOLL Medical Corporation. The company is a medical device company providing continuum of care in the area of sleep disorder based on its WatchPAT diagnostic devices and early diagnosis of Atherosclerosis.

Company overview

Itamar Medical was founded in 1997 as a developer of devices for assessing vascular defects. Its early products included technology for early detection of heart disease (EndoPAT) and detection of sleep disorders (WatchPAT).
The company is named after Itamar Yaron (one of the founders' brothers), who was killed in Yom Kippur War when trying to rescue an injured soldier and was later awarded with a Medal of Courage. Itamar's headquarter is located in Caesarea, Israel and has offices in the US, Japan and the Netherlands.

In 2007, the company went public on the Tel Aviv Stock Exchange and the on the Nasdaq. In 2011, the company made its first step on the Indian market.
In 2012, the company's WatchPAT started being distributed in Russia by Medical Diagnostic Methods.

In 2020, the company raised $40 million on the NASDAQ and won the SleepTech award for 2020.

In 2021, the company was acquired by ZOLL Medical Corporation and its stock delisted.

Company's devices 
 WatchPAT (FDA approval)
 EndoPAT (FDA approval)
 Sleep Apnea

References

External links
 

Companies of Israel
Companies formerly listed on the Nasdaq
Companies listed on the Tel Aviv Stock Exchange

Israeli companies established in 1997
Sleep disorders
2021 mergers and acquisitions